The 2004 Astro Wah Lai Toi Drama Awards, presented by Astro in Malaysia, was an awards ceremony that recognises the best Hong Kong television programmes that had aired on Malaysia's Astro Wah Lai Toi in 2004. The ceremony took place on 8 January 2005 at the Wisma MCA in Kuala Lumpur, Malaysia. It was televised live on Astro's Cantonese channel, Astro Wah Lai Toi. 

Square Pegs was the night's biggest winner, earning a total of four awards including My Favourite Drama and My Favourite Actor (Roger Kwok).

Winners and nominees
Winners are 100% based on popular vote.

References

TVB original programming
2005 television awards
2005 in Malaysian television
2005 in Hong Kong television